Borthwick is a hamlet in Scotland.

Borthwick may also refer to:

People
Clan Borthwick, a Scottish clan
Lord Borthwick, a title in the Peerage of Scotland
Borthwick baronets
Borthwick (surname)

Places
Borthwick Castle, Midlothian, Scotland
Borthwick Water, a river in Scotland

Other uses
, the name of two ships
Borthwick Institute for Archives, at the University of York

See also

Borthwickia, a genus of flowering plants
 Borwick (surname)